Placebo Effect is a 1998 American thriller film written by Luciano Saber and directed by Alejandro Seri. Featuring Francesco Quinn, Martin Halacy, and Kirsten Berman, it was released in the United States on 31 January 1998 and won Best Film at the New York Independent Film Festival in 1998.

Plot
Aleksander Ivanov is a cab driver from Bosnia who is drawn into a plot to assassinate the Vice President of the United States. Ivanov tries to find who is behind the plot.

Cast
 Francesco Quinn  as  Zac  
 Luciano Saber  as  Aleksander Ivanov  
 Martin Halacy  as  Congressman Ryan  
 Christopher Richard Garrett  as  Mick  
 Kirsten Berman  as  Rachel  
 Marshall Bean  as  Mr. Jones  
 Sarah Charipar  as  Jo  
 Travis Estes as  Ethan  
 David Mersault  as  Jimmy White  
 Tyla Abercrumbie  as  Suit  
 Lester Smith  as  Bartender  
 Tracey Stiles  as  Detective  
 Laura Wade  as  Artist  
 Eileen Flahegerty  as  Model

External links

 60% Fresh rating on Rotten Tomatoes

1998 films
1998 thriller films
Films set in Chicago
American independent films
American thriller films
1998 independent films
1990s English-language films
1990s American films